Børge Müller (4 September 1909 – 16 August 1963) was a Danish screenwriter. He wrote for 24 films between 1934 and 1963.

Filmography

 Skaf en sensation (1934)
 Cocktail (1937)
 Der var engang en Vicevært (1937)
 Alarm (1938)
 Blaavand melder Storm (1938)
 De tre måske fire (1939)
 En ganske almindelig pige (1940)
 Far skal giftes (1941)
 Tag til Rønneby Kro (1941)
 Mine kære koner (1943)
 Hatten er sat (1947)
 Mød mig paa Cassiopeia (1951)
 Som sendt fra himlen (1951)
 Hvad vil De ha'? (1956)
 Verdens rigeste pige (1958)
 Mor skal giftes (1958)
 Helle for Helene (1959)
 Flemming og Kvik (1960)
 Mine tossede drenge (1961)
 Peters baby (1961)
 Min kone fra Paris (1961)
 Han, Hun, Dirch og Dario (1962)
 Venus fra Vestø (1962)
 Frøken Nitouche (1963)

External links

1909 births
1963 deaths
Danish male screenwriters
20th-century screenwriters